Kernytsia is a village (selo) in Lviv Raion, Lviv Oblast, of Western Ukraine. Chuchenosy villages name has been in antiquities. The modern name of village was constituted in 1780. It belongs to Horodok urban hromada, one of the hromadas of Ukraine. 
Local government is administered by Kernytska village council.

Geography 

History and Attractions 
The first mention of Kernytsia dates from the year 1465. On the territory of village was a German colony Brundorf before World War II. The village was burned during World War II.

Until 18 July 2020, Kernytsia belonged to Horodok Raion. The raion was abolished in July 2020 as part of the administrative reform of Ukraine, which reduced the number of raions of Lviv Oblast to seven. The area of Horodok Raion was merged into Lviv Raion.

The village has an architectural monument of local importance of Horodok Raion (Horodok district) – Church of the Exaltation of the Cross 1888 (1572 –м).

References

External links 
 village Kernytsia
 weather.in.ua
 КАРПАТИ.INFO/Керниця

Literature 
  Page 259

Villages in Lviv Raion